Virginia Lourens (born 23 February 1975) is a Dutch taekwondo practitioner, born in Eindhoven. She competed at the 2000 Summer Olympics in Sydney.

References

External links

1975 births
Living people
Dutch female taekwondo practitioners
Olympic taekwondo practitioners of the Netherlands
Taekwondo practitioners at the 2000 Summer Olympics